Salakavala is a Suomisoundi-style psychedelic trance group from Finland. It consists of Tommy Lauhiala and Toni Sorsa. Their debut album Fractal Fishing was released in September, 2006 by Australian record label Faerie Dragon Records.

Salakavala has released their music in Internet before the release of Fractal Fishing. The band plays actively in psytrance-parties, in Finland and abroad.

Discography

Albums 

 Mockba Bolenath (Self-released), 2002)
 Fractal Fishing (Faerie Dragon Records, 2006)
 Unusual Conditions (Hippie Killer Productions, 2012)
 Magic Carpet (Hippie Killer Productions, 2018)

On compilations 

 "After Party" – Custom File (Exogenic Records, 2001)
 "Georgestreet" – Final Conflict (Liquid Revolution, 2003)
 "Undercover Attack" – Squeech (Faerie Dragon Records, 2006)
 "Ajan Huaskaust" – Psychotria Viridis (Random Records, 2011)
 "Brain Grill" – Saamisaundi (Random Records, 2015)
 "SaumiBlues" – Kwerk (Random Records, 2016)
 "Submarine" – Saamisaundi Vol.3 (Random Records, 2019)
 "No Glue" – 10 Years Of Randomness (Random Records, 2020)

External links 
 Salakavala at Discogs.com
 Antiscarp.com - Finnish psytrance mp3-release site hosted by Salakavala

Finnish electronic music groups
Psychedelic trance musical groups
Suomisaundi